Andrijana is a feminine given name and may refer to:

Andrijana Avramov (born 1979), Serbian politician
Andrijana Janevska (born 1981), Macedonian singer and musician
Andrijana Stipaničić (born 1981), Croatian biathlete
Andrijana Videnović (born 1964), Serbian actress

Feminine given names
Croatian feminine given names
Macedonian feminine given names
Serbian feminine given names